is an unreleased coin-op racing video game from Konami. It was to star Gradius's own signature ship, the Vic Viper (and various other vehicles), in a game resembling the F-Zero or Wipeout series. 
It was first shown at the 1995 JAMMA show.

In September 2011, the game's completed soundtrack was released on disc 10 of Konami Shooting Collection, an album featuring soundtracks from Salamander, TwinBee, and many other Konami shoot 'em ups, as well as other related games.

Notes

References

Cancelled arcade video games
Gradius video games